Filipino Mexicans are Mexican citizens who are descendants of Filipino ancestry. There are approximately 1,200 Filipino nationals residing in Mexico.  In addition, genetic studies indicate that about a third of people sampled from Guerrero have Asian ancestry with genetic markers matching those of the populations of the Philippines.

History

Filipinos first arrived in Mexico during the Spanish colonial period via the Manila-Acapulco Galleon which was controlled by administrators in Mexico City for the Spanish crown. For two and a half centuries, between 1565 and 1815, many Filipinos and Mexicans sailed to and from Mexico and the Philippines. Filipinos as slaves, prisoners, and crewmen, and Mexicans as governors, officers, soldiers and crewmen in the Manila-Acapulco Galleon, assisting New Spain in its trade between Asia and the Americas. The majority of the Asian migrants to Mexico during this period were called Filipinos, but were from a plethora of East Asian countries and to a smaller extent, other Asian slaves bought from the Portuguese or captured through war.

Though the numbers are unknown, it was so prevalent that slaves brought on ships were restricted to one per person (except persons of rank) in the "Laws Regarding Navigation and Commerce" (1611–1635) to avoid exhausting ship provisions. They were also taxed heavily upon arrival in Acapulco in an effort to reduce slave traffic. Traffic in Filipina women as slaves, servants, and mistresses of government officials, crew, and passengers, also caused scandals in the 17th century. Women comprised around 20 percent of the migrants from the Philippines.

Filipinos were also pressed into service as sailors, due to the native maritime culture of the Philippine Islands. By 1619, the crew of the Manila galleons were composed almost entirely of native sailors. Many of whom died during the voyages due to harsh treatment and dangerous conditions. Many of the galleons were also old, overloaded, and poorly repaired. These conditions prompted King Philip III to sign a law in 1620 forcing merchants to issue proper clothing to native crews. During this period, many Filipino sailors deserted as soon as they reached Acapulco. Sebastian de Piñeda, the captain of the galleon  complained to the king in 1619 that of the 75 Filipino crewmen aboard the ship, only 5 remained for the return voyage. The rest had deserted.

Some “Indios Chinos” were free Asian immigrants (chino libre) who had the right to carry a sword and dagger for personal protection. They often owned coconut plantations in Colima, an example from 1619 was Andrés Rosales who owned twenty-eight coconut palms. Others were merchants, like Tomás Pangasinan, a native of Pampanga, who was recorded to have paid thirteen pesos in taxes for the purchase of Chinese silks from the Manila galleons in the 17th century. The cities of Mexico, Puebla, and Guadalajara had enough Filipinos that they formed segregated markets of Asian goods called Parián (named after similar markets in the Philippines).

The descendants of these early migrants mostly settled in the regions near the terminal ports of the Manila galleons. These include Acapulco, Barra de Navidad, and San Blas, Nayarit, as well as numerous smaller intermediate settlements along the way. They also settled the regions of Colima and Jalisco before the 17th century, which were seriously depopulated of Native American settlements during that period due to the Cocoliztli epidemics and Spanish forced labor. They also settled in signiciant numbers in the barrio San Juan of Mexico City, although in modern times, the area has become more associated with later Chinese migrants. A notably large settlement of Filipinos during the colonial era is Coyuca de Benítez along the Costa Grande of Guerrero, which at one point in history was called "Filipino town".

Smaller waves of Filipino migration to Mexico took place in the late 19th and 20th centuries after the Philippines was annexed by the U.S. during the Spanish–American War of 1898–1900. A number of Filipino farm laborers and fishermen arrived to work in the Mexican west coast. These areas included the Baja California, Sonora and Sinaloa, while some had awaited to enter the United States to reunite with family members in Filipino American communities in California, and elsewhere. Mexican immigration law continues to grant special status for Filipinos.

Influence
The Filipinos introduced many cultural practices to Mexico, such as the method of making palm wine, called "tubâ",  the mantón de Manila,  the chamoy, and possibly the guayabera (called filipina in Veracruz and the Yucatán Peninsula). Distillation technology for the production of tequila and mezcal was also introduced by Filipino migrants in the late 16th century, via the adaptation of the stills used in the production of Philippine palm liquor (lambanog) which were introduced to Colima with tubâ.

Filipino words also entered Mexican vernacular, such as the word for palapa (originally meaning "coconut palm leaf petiole" in Tagalog), which became applied to a type of thatching using coconut leaves that resembles the Filipino nipa hut.

Various crops were also introduced from the Philippines, including coconuts, the Ataulfo and Manilita mangoes, abacá, rice, and bananas.

A genetic study in 2018 found that around a third of the population of Guerrero have 10% Filipino ancestry.

Historical records
Colonial-era Filipino immigrants to Mexico are difficult to trace in historical records because of several factors. The most significant factor being the use of the terms indio and chino. In the Philippines, natives were known as indios, but they lost that classification when they reached the Americas, since the term in New Spain referred to Native Americans. Instead they were called chinos, leading to the modern confusion of early Filipino immigrants with the much later Chinese immigrants in the late 1800s and early 1900s. Intermarriage and assimilation into Native American communities also buried the true extent of Filipino immigration, as they became indistinguishable from the bulk of the peasantry. 

Another factor is the pre-colonial Filipino (and Southeast Asian) tradition of not having last names. Filipinos and Filipino migrants acquired Spanish surnames, either after conversion to Christianity or enforced by the Catálogo alfabético de apellidos during the mid-19th century. This makes it very difficult to trace Filipino immigrants in colonial records.

Notable Mexicans of Filipino descent
 Ramón Fabié - Lieutenant Colonel commander of Miguel Hidalgo y Costilla
 Luis Pinzón - Military commander of José María Morelos
 Isidoro Montes de Oca – Mexican General and Lieutenant commander of Vicente Guerrero
 Romeo Tabuena – painter and printmaker
 Alejandro Gómez Maganda – Governor of Guerrero (1951–1954)
 Lili Rosales – Representative of Mexico in the Reina Hispanoamericana 2011 beauty contest
 Miguel A. Reina -  Mexican filmmaker, screenwriter and film producer.

See also
Mexico–Philippines relations
Manila galleon
Mexican settlement in the Philippines
Mestizos in Mexico
Filipino mestizo

References

External links
Color Q World: Asian-Latino Intermarriage in the Americas
Filipinos in Mexican History
Afro-Filipino Mongoys  (Photo of General Francisco Mongoy's descendants in the State of Guerrero)
Insurgent Leaders during Mexican War of Independence against Spain

Asian Mexican
 
Ethnic groups in Mexico
Mexico
Filipino Latin American
Immigration to Mexico
Mexico–Philippines relations